Zangi Kola-ye Sofla (also Romanized as Zangī Kolā-ye Soflá; also known as Zangī Kolā-ye Pā’īn) is a village in Dabuy-ye Shomali Rural District, Sorkhrud District, Mahmudabad County, Mazandaran Province, Iran. At the 2006 census, its population was 303, in 86 families.

References 

Populated places in Mahmudabad County